Bromo-DragonFLY (or 3C-Bromo-Dragonfly, DOB-Dragonfly)  is a substance related to the phenethylamine family. Bromo-DragonFLY is considered a potent hallucinogen, having around one third the potency of LSD with a normal dose in the region of 200 μg to 800 μg, and it has an extremely long duration of action, up to several days.  Bromo-DragonFLY has a stereocenter and (R)-(−)-bromo-DragonFLY is the more active stereoisomer.

History
Bromo-DragonFLY was first synthesized by Matthew Parker in the laboratory of David E. Nichols in 1998. As with the earlier and less potent dihydrofuran series of compounds nicknamed FLY, Bromo-DragonFLY was named after its superficial structural resemblance to a dragonfly.

Pharmacology
Bromo-DragonFLY demonstrates potent affinity at the 5-HT2A receptor (Ki 0.04 nM), similarly potent affinity at the 5-HT2C receptor (Ki 0.02 nM), and moderate affinity for the 5-HT2B receptor (Ki 0.19 nM)  Bromo-DragonFLY is also a MAO-A inhibitor, and thus strongly inhibits oxidative deamination of 5-HT, increasing its risk profile.

Chemistry
The first synthesis of racemic Bromo-DragonFLY was reported by David E. Nichols in 1998 and was an expansion upon earlier research into the tetrahydrobenzodifuran analogue of DOB. The 1998 synthesis of racemic Bromo-DragonFLY starts from hydroquinone, which is dialkylated with 1-bromo-2-chloroethane, brominated, and treated with n-butyllithium to yield the tetrahydrobenzodifuran ring system. After formylation of the ring system, the nitropropene derivative was obtained by condensation with nitroethane under ammonium acetate catalysis. The nitropropene derivative was then reduced with lithium aluminum hydride to yield the amine intermediate, which was protected with trifluoroacetic anhydride. Following para-bromination with elemental bromine and oxidation of the tetrahydrobenzodifuran ring system with DDQ, the trifluoroacetyl protecting group of the amine was removed to give Bromo-DragonFLY as a racemic mixture of the R and S enantiomers.

In 2001, David E. Nichols reported an enantiospecific synthesis of Bromo-DragonFLY which allowed the individual R and S enantiomers to be studied. Further research determined that (R)-(-)-Bromo-DragonFLY possessed greater binding affinity at the 5-HT2A and 5-HT2C receptors than (S)-(-)-Bromo-DragonFLY. To synthesize the more active R enantiomer, a derivative of D-alanine was reacted with 2,3,6,7-tetrahydrobenzodifuran in a Friedel–Crafts acylation, yielding an intermediate containing a β-keto moiety which was removed by treatment with triethylsilane in trifluoroacetic acid. After para-bromination and oxidation of the ring system with DDQ, the amine was deprotected yielding (R)-(-)-Bromo-DragonFLY.

Dosage
The typical dose of Bromo-DragonFLY is not known, however it has varied from 500 μg to 1 mg. It has about 300 times the potency of mescaline, or 1/3 the potency of LSD. It has been sold in the form of blotters, similar to the distribution method of LSD, which has led to confusion and reports of mistakenly consuming Bromo-DragonFly. It has a much longer duration of action than LSD and can last for up to 2–3 days following a single large dose, with a slow onset of action that can take up to 6 hours before the effects are felt.

Toxicity

The toxicity of Bromo-DragonFLY appears to be fairly high for humans, with reports of at least five deaths believed to have resulted from Bromo-DragonFLY in Norway, Sweden,
Denmark,
Finland
and the United States.
Laboratory testing has confirmed that in October 2009, a batch of Bromo-Dragonfly was distributed, mislabeled as the related compound 2C-B-FLY, which is around 20x less potent than BDF by weight. This mistake is believed to have contributed to several lethal overdoses and additional hospitalizations. The batch implicated in these deaths also contained significant synthesis impurities, which may have contributed to the toxicity.

Vasoconstrictive action resulting from severe overdose of Bromo-DragonFLY is known to have caused tissue necrosis of the extremities in at least one case.  In September 2007, a 35-year-old Swedish male required amputation of the front part of his feet and several fingers on one hand after taking a massive (but unknown) overdose; reportedly, the compound acted as a long-acting efficacious vasoconstrictor, leading to necrosis and gangrene which became apparent several weeks after the overdose occurred.  Treatment was of limited efficacy in this case, although tolazoline is reportedly an effective treatment where available.

Overdose-associated disturbing experiences and health problems have been described. One case in 2008 in England involved inhalation of vomit, causing nearly fatal asphyxia. Seizures have also been reported.

On October 3, 2009, a 22-year-old male from Copenhagen died after ingesting Bromo-DragonFLY. His friend described the trip saying, "It was like being dragged to hell and back again. Many times. It is the most evil [thing] I've ever tried. It lasted an eternity."

On May 7, 2011, in the United States, two young adults died after overdosing on Bromo-DragonFLY, which they thought was 2C-E, and several others were hospitalized during the same incident. Because they took a dosage appropriate for 2C-E, those who took the drug received, in some cases, 100x the normal dose. Both deaths followed seizures, vomiting blood, and terrifying hallucinations.

Drug prohibition laws

United States
Bromo-DragonFLY is unscheduled at federal level in the United States but could be prosecuted if it is sold for human consumption, Bromo Dragonfly is listed as a Schedule I in Oklahoma.

Canada
As of Oct 12, 2016, Bromo-DragonFLY is listed in Schedule III of the Canadian Controlled Drugs and Substances Act: "2C-phenethylamines and their salts, derivatives, isomers and salts of derivatives and isomers", a broad definition which corresponds to anything with a 2,5-dimethoxyphenethylamine core, including (but not limited to) the 2C family (including e.g. βk-2C-B), the DOx chemical class, the TMA family, Aleph aka DOT, NBOMe, the 25x-NBx series, and of course, Bromo-DragonFLY itself (see this article).

United Kingdom

Bromo-DragonFLY is  widely reported by the media as being a Class A drug. However, as of 2014, it remains unclear to what extent it is covered by the UK phenylethylamine catch-all clause, with commentators noting both the structural similarities and differences to the phenylethylamine class. If the prosecution could demonstrate structural similarity in court, it would be considered a Class A substance but as a benzodifuran it is significantly different to this class. It is not explicitly named in the misuse of drugs act. It would be covered by the UK Psychoactive Substances Act 2016  but only if is sold or traded for human consumption.

Sweden
Sveriges riksdag added Bromo-Dragonfly to schedule IV ("substances, plant materials and fungi that hasn't any or without nothing medical use") as narcotics in Sweden as of Jan 3, 2008,  published by Medical Products Agency in their regulation LVFS 2007:14 listed as Bromo-Dragonfly, brombensodifuranyl-isopropylamin. Bromo-DragonFLY was first classified as "health hazard" by Sveriges riksdags health ministry  under the act  (translated Act on the Prohibition of Certain Goods Dangerous to Health) as of Jul 15, 2007,  in their regulation SFS 2007:600 listed as brombensodifuranylisopropylamin (Bromo-Dragonfly), making it illegal to sell, purchase, buy, retail or possess.

Denmark
On December 3, 2007, the drug was banned in Denmark. The substance has been declared illegal by health minister Jakob Axel Nielsen, following recommendations from the Danish Health Ministry. It is currently classified as a dangerous narcotic and therefore its possession, manufacture, importation, supply or usage is strictly prohibited. Anyone involved in such activities can face legal action.

Norway
Bromo-DragonFLY is currently on the Norwegian narcotics list,. Thus it is effectively a narcotic drug by Norwegian law.

Poland

Currently, Bromo-DragonFLY is an uncontrolled substance in Poland.

Romania
The chemical compound has been added as an illegal substance under the Law 143/2000 on February 10, 2010.

Australia
As of 9 September 2011, Bromo-DragonFLY was added to Schedule 2 of the Queensland Drugs Misuse Regulation 1987.

Nationally, the drug is listed under Schedule 9 (Prohibited) of the Poisons Standard. Accordingly, the drug is prohibited in all states and territories.

Finland
As of 12 March 2012, Bromo-DragonFLY is an illegal designer drug.

See also
 2C-B
 DOB
 DOB-FLY
 2C-B-FLY
 5-HT2A receptor
 PiHKAL
 Ergotism

Notes

References

 
 
 Bromo-dragonfly – livsfarlig missbruksdrog
 Per, 35, blev stympad av dödsdrogen - Vårdades i respirator i tio dygn efter att ha tagit Bromo-Dragonfly
 
 

Bromoarenes
Designer drugs
Entheogens
Psychedelic phenethylamines
Serotonin receptor agonists
Substituted amphetamines
Heterocyclic compounds with 3 rings
Oxygen heterocycles